The National Military Council was the group of military officers that planned and carried out a coup d'état in November 1947 in Thailand. Their prestige and influence were quickly enhanced by Field Marshal Plaek Phibunsongkhram's return to politics. They would however outlast him and dominate Thai politics for the next two decades. Most would eventually receive high ranks, becoming generals and field marshals.

Membership
The council consisted of approximately forty junior army officers led by a small number of commanding officers, many of whom had been forced into retirement by Pridi Phanomyong at the end of the Second World War—men with little other than conspiracy to keep themselves occupied.

The coterie's leading members were Field Marshal Sarit Thanarat, commander of the Bangkok-based First Division, Police General Phao Siyanon, the powerful chief of police, Field Marshal Phin Chunhawan, Phao's father-in-law, the politically prominent Lieutenant-General Kat Katsongkhram, and Marshal of the Royal Thai Air Force Fuen Ronnaphakat, the air force's combat-experienced commander.  

Less senior members included Phin's son, Chatchai Chunhawan, and Sarit's protégés Thanom Kittikachorn and Praphas Charusathien.

See also 
 Military of Thailand
 Siamese coup d'état of 1947

References 

 
 Fineman, Daniel. A Special Relationship: The United States and Military Government in Thailand 1947-1958. University of Hawaii Press, 1997
 Stowe, Judith A. Siam Becomes Thailand: A Story of Intrigue. C. Hurst & Co. Publishers, 1991
 Suwannathat-Pian, Kobkua. Thailand's Durable Premier: Phibun through Three Decades 1932-1957. Oxford University Press, 1995.

20th century in Thailand
1947 in Thailand
Political history of Thailand